MonaLisa is a 2022 Sri Lankan Sinhala-language drama film directed by Eranga Senarathna and co-produced by Champika De Silva and Nishantha Galhena for YAYU Entertainment. The film stars Madushani Wickramasinghe and [Amila Karunanayake in lead roles whereas Buddhika Jayarathne, Sulochana Weerasinghe and Susanga Kahadawalarachchi made supportive roles.

Plot
The story revolves around a beautiful young girl named Kalpana. She comes to Colombo from a remote village to improve her dancing skills but she tries to commit suicide as a result of a relationship she has with a married man. Her life starts to change because of a young man named Madhuwantha whom she meets just moments before she commits suicide.

Cast
 Buddhika Jayarathne		
 Amila Karunanayake as Madhuwantha
 Madushani Wickramasinghe as Kalpana 
 Sulochana Weerasinghe		
 Susanga Kahadawalarachchi
 Kusum Perera		
 Rinsly Weerarathne

Production
Eranga Senaratne is the director and screenwriter of this artistic film where he previously made commercial films such as Surayahana Gini Gani, Ginigath Madhusamaya, Rosa Patikki, Sinasuna Adaren, Sweet Angel, and None Mage Sudu None. Surya Dayaruwan and Bhashi Madhubashini made playback singing to the music composed by Nmj Vacylavo and lyrics by Dinali Roshanthi Senaratne. A professional model Madushani Wickramasinghe made his debut cinema acting with the film. Although filming began during the COVID-19 pandemic season around Colombo for the main scenes, a number of scenes were used islandwide for the rest of the filming.

Upul Priyan is the cinematographer and Gayan Mahagalage is the assistant director, Anusha Jayawardena is the editor, Shan Alwis is the color director and Sanka Prasad is the choreographer. Janadara Aluthgamage is the feature writer, Chapa Perera is the art director, Nuwan Buddhika is the sound director and Shasin Gimhan Perera is the sound engineer.

Release
The filming commenced in June 2021 and production completed on January 18, 2022. A special screening of the film was held on 26 January 2022 at the Scope Cinema in Colombo City Center. At the event, Senaratne released four trailers of his coming soon films: Nilu Man Adarai, Adarai Janu, Mona Lisa and Ae. This is the first time that four pre-promotional films of the same director have been screened. The film was released on 18 February 2022 in nearly 15 cinemas islandwide.

References

External links
 MonaLisa on Sinhala Cinema Database
 
 Official trailer

2022 films
2020s Sinhala-language films
2022 drama films
Sri Lankan drama films